James Garnet Lamb (23 January 1908 – 10 April 1986) was an  Australian rules footballer who played with Geelong in the Victorian Football League (VFL).

Notes

External links 

1908 births
1986 deaths
Australian rules footballers from Victoria (Australia)
Geelong Football Club players
Newtown Football Club players